McLatchie is a surname. Notable people with the surname include:

Colin McLatchie ( 1878–1954), Scottish footballer
Greg McLatchie, British surgeon
Stewart McLatchie (1896–1968), Australian rules footballer